This article is a list of fictional characters who are featured in British web series Corner Shop Show.

Main characters
Islah Abdur-Rahman as Malik Begum (also plays the Corner Shop cash machine): The Corner Shop manager. A college drop out & an ex-road man, Malik has a lot of responsibility since his father left him in charge. His arrogance proves he has a lot to learn, but with the best intentions he's full of creative ideas for the business.
Michael Truong as Tony Chang (also plays Jason Duong): Corner Shop salesman. Supposedly moved to the UK from China around 1989. After losing his Chinese take-away store, Chang Noodles, he offered his services to work at the Corner Shop instead. His history is shrouded in mysteries about a Martial Arts cult & stories of working in a rice farm in his village

Recurring characters
Sheplo Mozomil as Riaz: University student who volunteers at the Corner Shop
Ali Shahalom as Saleem Akbar Choudhury Shamsul Haque: Visitor from Bangladesh who works in the Corner Shop but gets deported later on
Wasim Islam as Rohim: School pupil who works part-time at the Corner Shop
Bilal Shahid as Harry the Hobo: After being made redundant by Woolworths, he lost the plot and developed a paracetamol addiction. Harry turns up in the most random of places at the most random of times! 
Kaysar Miah as Tariq: Malik's best friend who helps out at the Corner Shop
Gina Badhen as Inspector Mia: The health and safety inspector
Hassan Khan as Saif: Owner of the rival shop, Off Licence. Rival of the Corner Shop, he opened up across the road and caused nothing but trouble. He seems to be working for a higher power and vowed to stop Malik's successes.
Hamza Jeetooa as Amil: Employee at the rival shop, Off Licence. Rival of the Corner Shop, he opened up across the road and caused nothing but trouble. He seems to be working for a higher power and vowed to stop Malik's successes. Amil is not to be messed with!
Master Askir Zakareah Khan as Sifu: Tony's master. Not much is known about Sifu, apart from the stories that Tony tells us. But from what we do know, is he is a dangerous man with knowledge of the secret ancient art of bag packing and satsui-no-such-thing!
Ameet Chana as Samad: Malik's older brother who lives in Dubai but occasionally visits
Javan Miller as Rampage: Spy working against the Corner Shop
David Mullane as Patrick: Irish chip shop owner. This Fish & Chip shop owner is a pleasant start to everyone's morning! With the luck of the Irish, he hasn't made many enemies apart from the delivery services from Dun Know Deliveries. This man needs his potatoes! 
Lawrence Ben Walters as Dun Know Dan: Repair, delivery and maintenance man. This Chip off the old block is everyone's handy man. Hustling with deliveries every morning and maintenance by night. Ya dun know dan done did da ting!
Samuel Frimpong as Mr. Asante: Ghanaian barber. Straight from Ghana comes this loud & proud barber Mr. Asante. He doesn't like Malik after an incident in his store, but gets along really well with his Grandad. Asante's famous shape ups go down well on this high street!
Aatif Nawaz as Raj King. Giving you the news that's not true, Raj King is the King of Television. He presents pretty much every show on Television fabricating stories and presenting headlines that generate views. He has a personal vendetta against Malik, and loves to give him negative limelight!
Yasmin Elizabeth as Shantelliqua: Nail salon beautician. Your ghetto-hoop-earinged-bad-chick who works at the local nail bar. She's known Malik since they were young on the block and has a feisty attitude, everyone knows not to get on her bad side cause "Shantelliqua Knows!"
Andrea Martinez as Claudia: Spanish nail salon beautician. The señorita from South-America, moved to the UK as a teen and met Shantelliqua in her block. Claudia added her Spanish spice to the mix & the two became a devious duo. Claudia's ghetto side gave her immediate street cred on the high street!
Tindy Grewal as Dun Know Naa-Tin: Delivery guy working for Dun Know Deliveries
Nadia Ali as Mum: Malik's mother. She's as strict as it gets! She has a habit of telling Malik off all the time, she spends most of her time at home watching Indian soap dramas & tracking down the aunties who didn't return her containers!
Manpreet Bambra as Shameena: Malik's cousin. There is very little going on in that brain of hers, but she gets away with it using her sweet innocence!
Kishen Tanna as Faizal Miah: Malik's cousin. Socially awkward, tech wiz, gamer & nerd. Faizal is the odd one out in the family, he likes to brag to his friends about being Malik's first cousin.
Shamila Nazir as Aleesha: Angry customer who later becomes temporary staff for the Corner Shop
Naresh Kumar as Zack: Security guard at the Corner Shop. With 100 Friends on Facebook (98 still pending) Zack has apparently been working in the security industry for years, he was left redundant by Woolworths and applied for the job at the Corner Shop
Robert Hoang as Kenny Chang: Tony's evil brother
Can Kabadayi, as Mehmet. It's never a dull day when Mehmet walks in the room, his enthusiasm got him hired by Malik as temp staff. But his lack of experience makes Malik regret his decision.
Karishma Bhandari, as Maleeka. If you ever imagined a female, successful, better version of Malik - it's his twin sister Maleeka. She's only 15 minutes older than him but knows how to get on his nerves!
Raxstar, as Vin Petrol. Better make sure you pass your Driving Test or else Vin Petrol has consequences! He runs the Driving School on the High Street and has a loyal crew behind him!
Inayat Kanji, as Khan/Mayor. The grand, illustrious, rich & posh Maleeka's Husband-To-Be! He is very aware of his great achievements & is not one to shy away from letting everyone know that!
Lynsey Pennycooke as Felicia: Maleeka's best friend
Sonna Rele as Sonna the Local Busker. Her bubbly personality is loved by everyone on the high street as she sings her heart out! She lives in her own little world spreading happiness through her amazing voice!
Irham Usman as Dr Geela: Pharmacy owner
Alexander Theo as Steve: High Street Properties employee who later becomes a zombie
Wasim Nawaz as Naseem: Relative of Malik

Guest characters
Michael Salami as Steve: Dodgy customer
Rukku Nahar as Meena: School girl 1
Janise Sadik as Melis: School girl 2
Mekial Hanif as Sifu's student
Suli Breaks as Himself
Jasmine Jardot as Sapphire
Tandy Tatter as Tandy Stark
Arman Anand as The High Street Hustler
Sunny and Shay as Radio presenters
Jordan Williams as Troy, customer at the Barber Shop
Andre Dwayne as Nathan, customer at the Barber Shop
Nico Jouvel as Eddy, barber working at the Barber Shop
Stephanie Kaur as Shannon Smith; TV Reporter and correspondent. Shannon is on the scene of every crime to get the latest gossip on the high street. Her hyper character and bimbo personality can be quite alarming, she barely blinks and rumour on the street is she never sleeps. As a fangirl of Malik, she stalks his every move!
Lauren Lashley as Pedestrian
Zuber Mohamed as Customer
Adam Rowland as Charity Worker
Kawsar Ahmed as Rafi: Malik's cousin
Ikramul Hoque as Shafi: Malik's cousin
Nusaiba Mohammad as Labeeba: Malik's cousin
Jez Dhillon as Sharon Kaur: Malik's ghetto neighbour, Punjabi & proud! You always know when Sharon's in the ends when you hear Punjabi music blaring from her speakers! She's vibrant, friendly, and runs her own meditation class in the local gym!
Babrul Hoque as Grandad: Malik's maternal grandad. Not your average old grandad, He's very aware of street culture & is full of stories of Bangladesh!
Ashley David as Isaac: Malik's childhood friend
Char Avell as Bruiser/Jahangeer: Malik's childhood friend
Shabnam Khanna as Bruiser's Aunty
Rameet Kaur Sandhu as Reema
Tommy Youle as Fury: Ramage's henchman
Michelle Khisa as Temper: Ramage's henchman
Samiz Mustak as Elayna: Work experience as receptionist for local council
Rob Compton as Agent Gully: High Street Investigation Department
Tanya Robb as Agent Colder: High Street Investigation Department
Guz Khan as Postman. Babylon always chase di Postman accusin him ah fraud! Postman always has the word on the high street as his ears are always open in everyone's business. This Jamaican-Asian postman has the most top secret info, but he won't give anything up without persuasion!
Rodney Sinclair as Kareem
Obi Njoku as Dreadman: Sifu's student
Rhys Richardson as Hairdo
Haidar Ali as Cafe Shop owner
Muazam Ayub as Cafe Shop customer
Ezza Khan as The 'Hangry' Wife
Mohasin Khan as The Angry Husband
Sara Asiya as Esta: High Street Properties
Stefano Fala as High Street Properties employee
Lachlan Walker as Edward. He only has a sense of humour for his Master, and his personality is close enough to that of a robot! But he is there for Khan's every beck & call!
Sharea Samuels as Bayliff
Nathaniel Martin Thomas as Jason the Bodyguard: Bayliff worker
Trina Marañon as Flag Girl
Malika St John as Goldie: Tony's crush
Jay Pharoah as Himself
Mariah Idrissi as Shayma
Laura Nicole as Maria: Claudia's friend
Hazera Ambce as Elena Layna: Malik's relative
Linton Reid as Mayor's employee
Ola Christian as Mayor's employee
Sacha Claxton as Mayor's employee
Humza Arshad as Humza Badman (and Humza's dad): Malik's friend
Nikkita Chadha and Ramzan Miah as Rich couple
Tarik Miah as Himself: Wedding manager
Richard Haynes as Faizal's friend
Eniyah Rana as Asian Clothes Shop worker
Hashu Mohammed as Malik's distant relative, his uncle's aunt's aunt informed him of Maleeka & Khan's wedding
Hai Li as Raj King's employee who swaps with Tony
Jon Madray as Raj King's employee who swaps with Malik
Eve Cong as Raj King's employee who swaps with Malik
Luke Ireland as Detective Inspector
Jo Shah as Detective Apprentice, has a crush on Malik
Nina Wadia as Faizal's mother who loves containers
Rucksar Naaz as Browngirlproblems
Irsa Saleem as Blogger's friend
Amber Doig-Thorne as Club owner, previously managed Woolworths before its redundancy
Unknown'' as Malik's father

Spin-offs and specials
List of Corner Shop Express characters
Main charactersIslah Abdur-Rahman as Malik BegumMichael H Truong as Tony Chang

Recurring charactersStephanie Kaur as Shannon Smith.Jez Dhillon as Sharon Kaur

Guest charactersChar Avell as Bruiser/JahangirBabrul Hoque (Bengali Blitz) as Malik's Grandad. Ikramul Hoque as ShafiKawsar Ahmed (Kash) as RafiKishen Tanna as Faizal MiahAatif Nawaz as Raj King.Nadia Ali as MumManpreet Bambra as Shameena.Nusaiba Mohammad as Labeeba

Christmas and New Years 2016 characters
Main charactersIslah Abdur-Rahman as Malik BegumMichael Truong as Tony ChangShamila Nazir as AleeshaCan Kabadayi, (Snatchy), as Mehmet.

Guest charactersSonna Rele as The BuskerEzza Khan as The 'Hangry' WifeMohasin Khan''' as The Angry Husband

See also
British Bangladeshis
Corner Shop Show
List of Corner Shop Show episodes

References

External links

Lists of web series characters